Our Lady of Kazan, also called Mother-of-God of Kazan, is a holy icon of the highest stature within the Russian Orthodox Church, representing the Virgin Mary as the protector and patroness of the city of Kazan, and a palladium of all of Russia and Rus', known as the Holy Protectress of Russia.  As is the case for any holy entity under a Patriarchate in communion within the greater Eastern Orthodox Church, it is venerated by all Orthodox faithful.

According to legend, the icon was originally acquired from Constantinople, lost in 1438, and miraculously recovered in pristine state over 140 years later in 1579. Two major cathedrals, the Kazan Cathedral, Moscow, and the Kazan Cathedral, St. Petersburg, are consecrated to Our Lady of Kazan, and they display copies of the icon, as do numerous churches throughout the land. The original icon in Kazan was stolen, and probably destroyed, in 1904. 

The "Fátima image" is a 16th-century copy of the icon, or possibly the 16th-century original, stolen from St. Petersburg in 1917 and purchased by F. A. Mitchell-Hedges in 1953. It was housed in Fátima, Portugal from 1970 to 1993, then in the study of Pope John Paul II in the Vatican from 1993 to 2004, when it was returned to Kazan, where it is now kept in the Kazan Monastery of the Theotokos. Copies of the image are also venerated in the Catholic Church.

Feast days of Our Lady of Kazan are 21 July, and 4 November (which is also the Russian Day of National Unity).

History
According to tradition, the original icon of Our Lady of Kazan was brought to Russia from Constantinople in the 13th century. After the establishment of the Khanate of Kazan ( 1438) the icon disappeared from the historical record for more than a century.

Metropolitan Hermogenes' chronicle, written at the request of Tsar Feodor in 1595, describes the recovery of the icon. According to this account, after a fire destroyed Kazan in 1579, the Virgin appeared to a 10-year-old girl, Matrona, revealing the location where the icon lay hidden. The girl told the archbishop about the dream, but she was not taken seriously. However, on 8 July 1579, after two repetitions of the dream, the girl and her mother recovered the icon on their own, buried under a destroyed house where it had been hidden to save it from the Tatars. 

 Other churches were built in honour of the revelation of the Virgin of Kazan, and copies of the image were displayed at the Kazan Cathedral of Moscow (constructed in the early 17th century), at Yaroslavl, and at St. Petersburg.

Russian military commanders Dmitry Pozharsky (17th century) and Mikhail Kutuzov (19th century) credited invocation of the Virgin Mary through the icon with helping the country to repel the Polish invasion of 1612, the Swedish invasion of 1709, and Napoleon's invasion of 1812. The Kazan icon achieved immense popularity, and there were nine or ten separate miracle-attributed copies of the icon around Russia.

Thieves apparently coveted the icon's gold frame, which was ornamented with many valuable jewels. Several years later, Russian police apprehended the thieves and recovered the frame. The thieves originally declared that the icon itself had been cut to pieces and burnt, although one of them eventually confessed that it was housed in a monastery in the wilds of Siberia. This one, however, was believed to be a fake, and the Russian police refused to investigate, using the logic that it would be very unlucky to venerate a fake icon as though it were authentic. The Orthodox Church interpreted the disappearance of the icon as a sign of tragedies that would plague Russia after the image of the Holy Protectress of Russia had been lost. Indeed, the Russian peasantry was wont to credit all the miseries of the Revolution of 1905, as well as Russia's defeat in the Russo-Japanese War of 1904–1905, to the desecration of her image.

Fátima image 

After the Russian Revolution of 1917, there was speculation that the original icon was in fact preserved in St. Petersburg. Reportedly, an icon of Our Lady of Kazan was used in processions around Leningrad fortifications during the Siege of Leningrad (1941-1944) during World War II. 

Another theory proposed that the Bolsheviks had sold the image abroad, although the Russian Orthodox Church did not accept such theories. The history of the stolen icon between 1917 and 1953 is unknown. In 1953  Frederick Mitchell-Hedges purchased an icon from Arthur Hillman. 
Although the status of the icon as the original Kazan icon remained disputed, Cyril G.E. Bunt concluded "that it is the work of a great icon painter of the 16th century [...] the pigments and the wood of the panel are perfectly preserved as exhaustive X-ray tests have proved, and have mellowed with age", suggesting that while it was a copy of the original icon, it was nevertheless the original icon carried by Pozharski in 1612. It was exhibited at the  World Trade Fair in New York in 1964–1965. On 13 September 1965, members of the Blue Army of Our Lady of Fátima spent the night in veneration of the icon in the pavilion in New York. The Blue Army eventually bought the icon from Anna Mitchell-Hedges for US$125,000 in January 1970, and the icon was enshrined in Fátima, Portugal.

In 1993 the icon from Fátima was given to the Vatican and Pope John Paul II had it installed in his study, where he venerated it for eleven years. In his own words, "it has found a home with me and has accompanied my daily service to the Church with its motherly gaze". John Paul II wished to visit Moscow or Kazan so that he himself could return the icon to the Russian Orthodox Church. However the Moscow Patriarchate was suspicious that the Pope might have other motives, so he presented the icon to the Russian Church unconditionally in August 2004. On August 26, 2004, it was exhibited for veneration on the altar of St. Peter's Basilica and then delivered to Moscow. This copy is sometimes nicknamed “Vatikanskaya.”

The icon is now enshrined in the Cathedral of the Elevation of the Holy Cross, part of the Convent of the Theotokos (re-established as a monastery in 2005), on the site where the original icon of Our Lady of Kazan was found, and plans are underway to make the monastery's other buildings into an international pilgrimage centre.

References

External links

Rediscovered Holy Treasure 
Ikons: Windows into Heaven 
The Miraculous Icons—an entry on Our Lady of Kazan at OrthodoxWorld.ru 
OrthodoxWiki entry on Our Lady of Kazan 

Shrines to the Virgin Mary
Kazan
Russian icons
Christianity in Kazan
Kazan, Our Lady of
History of Kazan
Paintings of the Madonna and Child
Stolen works of art
Lost paintings